13th Dragoons or 13th Dragoon Regiment may refer to the following military units:
13th Hussars, British Army unit active 1715–1922, and called by this name 1751–1783
13th Dragoon Regiment of the French Army, the 13th Parachute Dragoon Regiment since 1952
13th Bohemian Dragoons of the Austro-Hungarian Army